Trypetheliopsis is a genus of lichenized fungi within the family Monoblastiaceae. It contains 8 species.

References

External links
Trypetheliopsis at Index Fungorum

Trypetheliaceae
Monotypic Dothideomycetes genera
Lichen genera